This is a list of all the recorded matches played by the Bhutan national football team, which represents Bhutan in international men's football. The team is controlled by the governing body for football in Bhutan, the Bhutan Football Federation, which is currently a member of the Asian Football Federation and the regional body the South Asian Football Federation. Bhutan play their home games at the national stadium, Changlimithang.

Results

This is a list of all football matches played by Bhutan national under-23 football team from their recorded debut in the 2004 South Asian Games in Pakistan.

2004

2006

2010

2016

Summary record

By venue
As at 9 February 2016:

By year
As at 9 February 2016:

By opponent
Last match updated:  on 9 February 2016.

Competitive record
The under-23 team have only ever competed in the South Asian Games.

South Asian Games

References

Bhutan national football team results